Bayanat (also known as Bayanat Al Oula for Network Services) is a Saudi company established in 2005 by three Saudi leading communication firms: Nour Communications, Baud Telecom Company and Al-Harbi Telecom., Bayanat was licensed by the Communication & Information Technology Commission (CITC) to provide local, national, and international data communications services.

See also 
 Communication in Saudi Arabia
 Integrated Telecom Company
 Saudi Telecom Company
 Mobily

External links 
 Bayanat Homepage (Official website of Bayanat)
 Data Service Provider License for "Bayanat Al Oula for Network Services" (in Arabic PDF format)
 List of licensed Service Providers in Saudi Arabia (from CITC website)

Telecommunications companies of Saudi Arabia
Telecommunications in Saudi Arabia
Telecommunications companies established in 2005
2005 establishments in Saudi Arabia